The 2019 Copa Colsanitas (also known as the 2019 Claro Open Colsanitas for sponsorship reasons) was a women's tennis tournament played on outdoor clay courts. It was the 22nd edition of the tournament and part of the International category of the 2019 WTA Tour. It took place at the Centro de Alto Rendimiento in Bogotá, Colombia, from April 8 through April 14, 2019.

Points and prize money

Point distribution

Prize money 

*per team

Singles main-draw entrants

Seeds 

1 Rankings as of 1 April 2019.

Other entrants 
The following players received wildcards into the main draw:
  Emiliana Arango
  Sabine Lisicki
  María Camila Osorio Serrano
 
The following player received entry using a protected ranking into the main draw:
  Shelby Rogers

The following players received entry from the qualifying draw:
  Irina Bara
  Aliona Bolsova 
  Beatriz Haddad Maia
  Jasmine Paolini
  Chloé Paquet
  Bibiane Schoofs

The following players received entry as lucky losers:
  Kristie Ahn
  Francesca Di Lorenzo
  Sara Errani
  Elitsa Kostova
  Hiroko Kuwata

Withdrawals 
  Eugenie Bouchard → replaced by  Varvara Lepchenko
  Zarina Diyas →  replaced by  Kristie Ahn
  Misaki Doi → replaced by  Irina Khromacheva
  Julia Glushko → replaced by  Astra Sharma
  Nao Hibino →  replaced by  Sachia Vickery
  Dalila Jakupović → replaced by  Sara Errani
  Ivana Jorović → replaced by  Hiroko Kuwata
  Tatjana Maria→ replaced by  Elitsa Kostova
  Petra Martić → replaced by  Francesca Di Lorenzo

Doubles main-draw entrants

Seeds 

 Rankings as of 1 April 2019.

Other entrants 
The following pairs received wildcards into the doubles main draw:
  Emiliana Arango /  María Camila Osorio Serrano
  María Herazo González /  Yuliana Lizarazo

Withdrawals 
  Emiliana Arango (right ankle injury)
  Dalila Jakupović (left eye injury)

Champions

Singles 

  Amanda Anisimova def.  Astra Sharma, 4–6, 6–4, 6–1

Doubles 

  Zoe Hives /  Astra Sharma def.  Hayley Carter /  Ena Shibahara, 6–1, 6–2

References

External links 
 

Copa Claro Colsanitas
Copa Colsanitas
Copa Claro Colsanitas
Copa Colsanitas